Private Demensio Rivera (April 28, 1932 – March 19, 1964) was a United States Army veteran of the Korean War who was awarded the Distinguished Service Cross; the award was upgraded in 2014, decades after his death, to the Medal of Honor.

Biography
Demensio Rivera y Avilés was the youngest of five children born in Cabo Rojo, Puerto Rico to Demensio Rivera Y Negrón and Dolores Avilés De Rivera. He was still a child when his parents moved to New York City, where he was raised.

On September 26, 1950, Rivera joined the United States Army in New York. In 1951, he was deployed to the Republic of Korea as a member of Company G, 2nd Battalion, 7th Infantry Regiment, 3rd Infantry Division. When his unit was attacked by the enemy during the UN May–June 1951 counteroffensive, he delivered continuous and devastating fire at them with his automatic rifle until his weapon became inoperative. He employed his pistol and grenades and stopped the enemy within a few feet of his position. Rivera was seriously wounded and was awarded the Distinguished Service Cross, the Army's second highest military decoration. His DSC was upgraded to the Medal of Honor and was posthumously awarded to him in 2014.

Rivera was residing in New York City where he died on March 19, 1967. His body was transferred to Puerto Rico. He was buried with full military honors in section C row K -184 at the Cementerio San Miguel Arcangel located in Carretera PR-308, Parcelas Puerto Real, Cabo Rojo.

Medal of Honor
The bestowal of the Medal of Honor recognized Rivera for his actions at Changyong-ni, Korea, May 22–23, 1951. When the outpost area occupied by his platoon was assaulted during the night, Rivera, an automatic rifleman, held his forward position tenaciously, although exposed to very heavy fire. When his rifle became inoperative, Rivera employed his pistol and grenades, and eventually fought the enemy hand-to-hand and forced them back.

Rivera was posthumously awarded the Medal of Honor by President Barack Obama in a March 18, 2014 White House ceremony.  Rivera was one of four Puerto Ricans to be honored that day and one of nine Puerto Ricans to have received the Medal of Honor.

The award came through the Defense Authorization Act which called for a review of Jewish American and Hispanic American veterans from World War II, the Korean War and the Vietnam War to ensure that no prejudice was shown to those deserving the Medal of Honor.

Medal of Honor citation

Honors, awards and decorations
Among Private Rivera's military decorations are the following:

Note

See also

 List of Korean War Medal of Honor recipients
List of Puerto Ricans
List of Puerto Rican military personnel
List of Puerto Rican recipients of the Medal of Honor
List of Hispanic Medal of Honor recipients

References

1933 births
1967 deaths
United States Army soldiers
United States Army personnel of the Korean War
Korean War recipients of the Medal of Honor
Puerto Rican recipients of the Medal of Honor
United States Army Medal of Honor recipients
Recipients of the Distinguished Service Cross (United States)
Puerto Rican Army personnel
People from Cabo Rojo, Puerto Rico